Frederick L. Honhart (May 31, 1885 – May 2, 1983) was an American football and basketball coach.  He was the seventh head football coach at Kansas State Normal School—now known as Emporia State University—in Emporia, Kansas, serving for three seasons, from 1909 to 1911, and compiling a record of 13–8–2. He was the son of Charles and Mary Honhart. In 1916, Honhart graduated from the University of Louisville School of Medicine with a medical degree. He moved to Detroit, Michigan later that year to practice medicine, where he remained for most of his life.

In 1918, Honhart was commissioned as a lieutenant in the United States Army. He was stationed at various Army hospitals to do "surgical work". Honhart died on May 2, 1983, at St. John Hospital in Detroit.

References

External links
 

1885 births
1983 deaths
Emporia State Hornets basketball coaches
Emporia State Hornets football coaches
Springfield Pride football players
University of Louisville School of Medicine alumni
United States Army officers
People from Warren, Pennsylvania
Coaches of American football from Pennsylvania
Players of American football from Pennsylvania
Basketball coaches from Pennsylvania
Military personnel from Pennsylvania
Physicians from Detroit